Alexander Leonidovich Knyazhinsky (24 January 1936 – 14 June 1996), also spelt Aleksandr Knyazhinskiy, was a Soviet and Russian cinematographer, noted for his work on Andrei Tarkovsky's Stalker.

He was made a People's Artist of Russia in 1992.

Selected filmography
 The City of Masters (1965)
You and Me (1971)
Autumn (1974)
Wounded Game (1977)
 Stalker (1979)
Life on Holidays (1980)
 If to Believe Lopotukhin... (1983)

References

External links
 
 (Interview)

1936 births
1996 deaths
Mass media people from Moscow
People's Artists of Russia
Soviet cinematographers